This is a list of cities in Guinea-Bissau order by population.  All settlements with a population of over 5,000 are included.

Cities

Other settlements
Boe
Tombali

References 

Guinea-Bissau, List of cities in
 
Guinea-Bisseau
Cities